The Shanxiang Mosque is a mosque in Runzhou District, Zhenjiang City, Jiangsu Province, China.

History
The mosque was constructed in 1662 and had undergone several reconstruction afterwards. In 1903, the mosque established an Islamic school. During the World War II, the mosque served as a refugee camp from the Japanese invasion. Currently, the mosque regularly hold several activities such as Imam training, hold forums, and guest receptions.

Architecture
The mosque has an area of 2,000 m2 built with traditional Chinese architecture style.

See also
 Islam in China
 List of mosques in China

References

1662 establishments in China
Buildings and structures in Zhenjiang
Mosques in China
Mosques completed in 1662
Religious buildings and structures in Jiangsu